The term "After School Special" refers to a genre of American television programs that are intended to be viewed by adolescents after they returned home from school.

After School Special may also refer to:

 ABC Afterschool Special, the 1972–1997 American television anthology series for children and teenagers
 "After School Special", a song by Detroit Grand Pubahs and Miss Kittin from the album Funk All Y'all
 "After School Special" (Supernatural), an episode of the television series Supernatural
 "After School Special" (The Vampire Diaries), an episode of the television series The Vampire Diaries
 "The American Dad After School Special", an episode of the Fox animated television series American Dad!
 National Lampoon's Barely Legal, a 2003 film that is also known as After School Special
 "After School Special", a song by Mr. Bungle from the album Disco Volante